The 1999 FIVB Women's World Cup was held from 2 to 16 November 1999 in Japan. The winner received a fast lane ticket into the 2000 Summer Olympics.

Twelve women's national teams played at several venues across Japan. the teams were the hosts Japan, continental and vice-champions from Asia, Europe, NORCECA and South America, the African continental champion, and two wild-card teams created by the FIVB and the Japan Volleyball Association.

Teams played a 66-game single-round robin format match, in two groups (site A and site B).

Teams

  — Host
  — African Champions
  — Asian Champions
  — European Champions
  — NORCECA Champions
  — South American Champions

  — Asian Vice-champions
  — European Vice-champions
  — NORCECA Vice-champions
  — South American Vice-champions
  — Wild-card
  — Wild-card

Squads

Results

|}

First round

Site A
Venue: Yoyogi National Gymnasium, Tokyo

|}

Site B
Venue: Okayama General and Cultural Gymnasium, Okayama

|}

Second round

Site A
Venue: Hokkaido Prefectural Sports Center, Sapporo

|}

Site B
Venue: Toyama City Gymnasium, Toyama

|}

Third round

Site A
Venue: Sendai City Gymnasium, Sendai

|}

Site B
Venue: Synthesis Gymnasium, Kanazawa

|}

Fourth round

Site A
Venue: Nagoya Rainbow Hall, Nagoya

|}

Site B
Venue: Osaka Prefectural Gymnasium, Osaka

|}

Final standing

Awards

 Most Valuable Player
  Taismary Agüero
 Best Scorer
  Barbara Jelić
 Best Spiker
  Lioubov Sokolova
 Best Server
  Taismary Agüero

 Best Receiver
  Lioubov Sokolova
 Best Setter
  Elena Vassilevskaya
 Best Digger
  Hiroko Tsukumo
 Best Blocker
  Mirka Francia

External links
 Results

1999 Women's
Women's World Cup
V
V
November 1999 sports events in Asia
Women's volleyball in Japan